(September 14, 1924 – September 22, 1997) was a Japanese-Brazilian painter. Mabe worked as a vendor of hand-painted ties in São Paulo before becoming a famous artist.

In the late 1950s, Mabe won the top award in São Paulo's Contemporary Art Salon, the top award as Brazil's best painter in the São Paulo Bienal, and the top honors for artists under 35 at Paris's first biennial.

On January 30, 1979, after an exhibition in Tokyo, 53 of his paintings were on board a Varig cargo Boeing 707-323C en route from Tokyo - Narita to Rio de Janeiro-Galeão via Los Angeles. The aircraft (and the paintings) went missing over the Pacific Ocean some 30 minutes (200 km ENE) from Tokyo. The cause is unknown since the wreck was never found.

His works are currently displayed in the permanent exhibitions of the São Paulo Contemporary Art Museum, the Modern Art Museum in Rio de Janeiro, the Boston Contemporary Art Museum, the Beaux-Arts Museum of Dallas among others. The Rio de Janeiro National Museum for the Beaux-Arts lodges the most expressive paintings of a Still Nature (oil on canvas). Other institutions that display his work are the National Art Museum of Bolivia and the V+R Sapoznik Art Collection.

Mabe died in São Paulo on September 22, 1997.

See also

 Japanese Brazilian
 Tadashi Kaminagai

References

External links
Manabu Mabe Official Website

Naturalized citizens of Brazil
1997 deaths
Japanese emigrants to Brazil
People from Kumamoto Prefecture
People from São Paulo
1924 births
20th-century Brazilian painters
20th-century Brazilian male artists
20th-century Japanese painters
Artists from Kumamoto Prefecture